Miloševići is a village in the municipality of Višegrad, Bosnia and Herzegovina.

History
In 1942, the Croatian fascist Ustaše regime slaughtered about 6,000 Serbs in Stari Brod near Rogatica and Miloševići.

References

Populated places in Višegrad